David Verrey is a British television, film and stage actor.

Television
His best known roles were those of Serge Starr in more than 200 episodes of the soap Family Affairs, Golgarach and McGrew in the children's adventure game series Knightmare and the shape shifting alien villain Joseph Green in the Doctor Who episodes "Aliens of London" (for which he also contributed an episode commentary to the Doctor Who: Complete Series One DVD boxset) and "World War Three". He has also guest starred in The Game, Musketeers, Game Of Thrones, Masterworks, The Bill, Judge John Deed, Agatha Christie's Poirot, Birds of a Feather, Red Dwarf, Lexx, "Law & Order UK", and Dream Team, amongst many other TV appearances.

Film
He has appeared in featured roles in the Britcoms Bridget Jones: The Edge of Reason and Sixty Six, and in 2006 co-starred with Gabriel Byrne and Mira Sorvino in Alexander Buravsky's Russian-set World War II epic Attack on Leningrad.

Theatre
David Verrey's theatre appearances are numerous, including seasons with the:
 Royal National Theatre
 England People Very Nice
 The Coast of Utopia
 The Madness of George III (as Charles James Fox)
 The Recruiting Officer
 Royal Shakespeare Company
 The Comedy of Errors
 English Shakespeare Company
 Hamlet (as Claudius)
 The Merchant of Venice (as Shylock)
 Romeo and Juliet (as Mercutio)

External links

British male film actors
British male stage actors
British male television actors
Living people
Year of birth missing (living people)